The Two Orphans (Italian:Le due orfanelle) is a 1942 Italian historical drama film directed by Carmine Gallone and starring Alida Valli, María Denis and Osvaldo Valenti. It was based on the play The Two Orphans by Adolphe d'Ennery and Eugène Cormon, one of many film adaptations. It was made at Cinecittà in Rome.

Cast

See also
 Orphans of the Storm (1921)
 The Two Orphans (1933)
 The Two Orphans (1954)
 The Two Orphans (1965)
 The Two Orphans (1976)

References

Bibliography 
 Nowell-Smith, Geoffrey & Hay, James & Volpi, Gianni. The Companion to Italian Cinema. Cassell, 1996.

External links 
 

1942 films
Italian historical drama films
1940s historical drama films
1940s Italian-language films
Films directed by Carmine Gallone
Italian films based on plays
Films set in Paris
Films set in the 19th century
Films shot at Cinecittà Studios
Italian black-and-white films
1942 drama films
Films scored by Renzo Rossellini
1940s Italian films